St Mary's Stadium is an all-seater football stadium in Southampton, England, which has been the home stadium of Premier League club Southampton F.C. since 2001. The stadium has a capacity of 32,384 and is currently the largest football stadium in South East England.

the Taylor Report on 29 January 1990 required all First and Second Division clubs to have all-seater stadiums by August 1994, Southampton's directors initially decided to upgrade The Dell into an all-seater stadium (which was completed in 1993) but speculation about relocation continued, especially as an all-seater Dell had a capacity of just over 15,000; despite this, Southampton continued to defy the odds and survive in the new FA Premier League after 1992.

After a lengthy and ultimately unsuccessful attempt to build a new 25,000-seater stadium and leisure complex at Stoneham, on the outskirts of Southampton, the city council offered the club the chance to build a new ground on the disused gas work site in the heart of the city, about one and half miles from The Dell.

The move was cited as the club returning home, because the club was formed by members of the nearby St. Mary's Church, as the football team of St. Mary's Church Young Men's Association before becoming Southampton St. Mary's F.C., and eventually Southampton F.C. 
Construction started in December 1999 and was completed at the end of July 2001, with work on the 32,689 seat stadium itself and improvements to local infrastructure cost a total of £32 million.

The Saints have been in residence since August 2001 when they moved from The Dell, which for the final years of its life, held just over 15,000 spectators – less than half the size of the new stadium. The first match was played on 1 August 2001 against RCD Espanyol, with the Spanish side winning 4–3.

The first competitive hat trick at the stadium was scored by Stafford Browne for Aldershot Town in a 3–1 victory over Havant & Waterlooville in the Hampshire Senior Cup final on 1 May 2002.

In 2022, the stadium was used one of the venues to host the UEFA Women's Euro 2022. It was used to host Group A matches, which had the hosts England.

Description

The stadium is a complete bowl, with all stands of equal height. There are two large screens at either end that can be seen from any seat.

The stadium has four stands, which are named after the areas of Southampton they face. The main (east) stand is the Itchen Stand, and faces the River Itchen. The opposite stand is called the Kingsland Stand. Behind the south goal is the Chapel Stand, and to the north is the Northam Stand.

At the rear of the Chapel, Kingsland and Northam Stands, there is a continuous, translucent 'panel' that is designed to allow light to access the pitch. A large section of the roof at the Chapel Stand, at the southern end of the stadium is also translucent, for the same reason.

At the rear of the Itchen Stand, there are 42 executive boxes, and a police control room. The stand also houses the club's offices, changing rooms, press facilities and corporate hospitality suites. The four main hospitality suites are named after some of Saints' greatest players:
 Terry Paine
 Mick Channon
 Bobby Stokes
 Matt Le Tissier

The Northam Stand is home to the majority of the more vocal supporters, as well as visiting fans. Visitors can be given up to 4,250 seats (15 per cent of the capacity) for cup games, and up to 3,200 for league matches.

Name
The official ground name at opening was 'The Friends Provident St Mary's Stadium'. Initially the club wanted the ground to be named purely after the sponsors, but fan pressure influenced the decision to include a non-commercial title. In 2006 the new sponsor Flybe did not choose to purchase the naming rights to the stadium, meaning it reverted to the name 'St Mary's Stadium'.

Capacity

The ground has an all-seated capacity of 32,505, including the press and directors boxes. Because of the segregation between home and away fans in the Northam Stand, it is unlikely the full capacity will ever be reached for a competitive match.

The current record attendance was for the Football League Championship match between Southampton and Coventry City on 28 April 2012, when 32,363 spectators attended. The lowest league record was Southampton versus Sheffield United, when just 13,257 attended.

When the club had lower league position this had a negative impact on attendances, although the visit of Exeter City on Boxing Day, 2009 in a League One fixture, attracted an attendance of 30,890. During the 2009–10 League One campaign, attendances increased significantly, attracting 29,901 against Milton Keynes Dons in the Football League Trophy and then, just 4 days later, 31,385 in a South Coast derby against Portsmouth in the FA Cup. The overall average attendance for the league season was 20,982, a near 3,000 improvement on the previous season despite being a league lower. During the 2010–11 League One campaign the lowest attendance was 18,623 against Yeovil, while the highest was 31,653 against Walsall.

All stands, apart from the Itchen stand, can be built upon and expanded. Overall this would give an approximate capacity of around 50,000, and would cost a similar amount to how much it cost to build the stadium in the first place, which was approximately £32,000,000.

The Ted Bates statue

On 17 March 2007, the £102,000 statue to commemorate club stalwart Ted Bates was unveiled, outside the front of the Itchen Stand. Almost immediately, the statue was widely condemned by supporters due to it being out of proportion, and not an accurate likeness of the former club President. The  statue was made by sculptor Ian Brennan.

Former chairman, Leon Crouch stated that he would help fund a replacement or remedial work, in association with the Ted Bates Trust, who were overseeing the collection of funds, commission and erection of the statue. The statue was removed less than a week after its unveiling. The replacement statue, by sculptor Sean Hedges-Quinn, was unveiled on 22 March 2008.

Notable matches
The St Mary's Stadium has hosted two full England international matches, a 2–2 draw between England and Macedonia in October 2002, while Wembley Stadium was out of action due to redevelopment and the Football Association decided that England games would be played at various venues around the country. David Beckham and Steven Gerrard scored for England. The second was a 5–3 win against Kosovo in a Euro 2020 Qualifier on 10 September 2019. Raheem Sterling, Harry Kane and Jadon Sancho scored for England. There has also been an international between Japan and Nigeria.

The stadium first hosted European football in September 2003, when the Saints faced Romanian side Steaua Bucharest in the first round of the UEFA Cup. The game ended in a 1–1 draw.

In 2016, Southampton had their first venture in the UEFA Europa League and their first game against Czech side Sparta Prague ended in a 3–0 win. Later in the group stage, they faced former champions Inter Milan and won 2–1.

The venue hosted two England under-21 internationals. The first was a 2009 UEFA European Under-21 Championship qualification Group 3 match against the Republic of Ireland's under-21s on 20 November 2008. The hosts thrashed the visitors 3–0 thanks to Stephen O'Halloran's sixtieth minute own goal followed by James Milner's sixty eighth-minute goal and Theo Walcott's seventy eighth-minute goal with 31,473 in attendance. The other was an international friendly against Norway's under-21s on 28 March 2011. The hosts beat the visitors 2 – 0 with goals from Daniel Sturridge on the ninth minute and Danny Rose on the fortieth minute with 18,000 in attendance.

In 2022 the venue hosted 3 matches of the UEFA Women’s Euro 2022. Thursday 7 July: Norway vs Northern Ireland 
Monday 11 July: Austria vs Northern Ireland 
Friday 15 July: Northern Ireland vs England

Between Monday 1 June and Friday 5 June 2015, St Mary's Stadium hosted a world record breaking match for the longest continuous football game ever played. Players from Southampton-based charity Testlands Support Project played for 102 hours straight, beating the previous record of 101 hours.

International games hosted

Non-footballing use
As is common for modern day stadia, St Mary's is also used as a conference facility, with hospitality suites available for this purpose most days of the week.

In the Northam Stand the Saints Study Support Centre – a club-run initiative to help school children outside class – can be found, along with the offices of Southampton City Training, a quasi-council run organisation which helps young people get vocational training.

It is also used as a prom setting for many local schools of Southampton, including St. Anne's, St. George's, Wyvern School and Wildern Secondary School.

The stadium has also held film premieres for movies such as Casino Royale, as well as music concerts by Elton John in 2005 and Bon Jovi in 2006. There was a tribute to Elvis Presley in August 2007 and Southampton fan Craig David played at St Mary's on 25 October 2007, although neither in the main bowl of the stadium. Bon Jovi returned to St Mary's on 11 June 2008.
and on 6 June 2017 Robbie Williams had The Heavy Entertainment Show Tour. On 29 May 2018, The Rolling Stones performed at the stadium as part of their No Filter Tour. Alongside the Ricoh Arena in Coventry, St Mary's was the smallest venue on the UK leg of the tour.
On 30 May 2022 St Marys Stadium hosted The Killers.
Additionally, St Mary's also houses the head office of the Hampshire & Isle of Wight Air Ambulance since its founding in 2007.

St Mary's was one of the seventeen venues short-listed for use in the 2015 Rugby World Cup but was not selected for the final list.

Folklore and local legends
According to local legend, during construction of the stadium, a group of Portsmouth F.C. supporters buried their team's shirt under the Northam Stand end of the pitch and cast a curse that caused the team's initial losing streak at the new stadium. Pagan witch Ceridwen Dragonoak Connelly performed a Celtic ceremony to lift the curse just prior to the team's first win.

Facts and figures
Average attendance:

2021–22: 29,884 (Premier League) 
2020–21: NA* (Premier League) 
2019–20: 29,651* (Premier League) 
2018–19: 30,139 (Premier League) 
2017–18: 30,794 (Premier League) 
2016–17: 30,936 (Premier League) 
2015–16: 30,750 (Premier League) 
2014–15: 30,652 (Premier League) 
2013–14: 30,212 (Premier League) 
2012–13: 30,874 (Premier League) 
2011–12: 26,419 (Championship) 
2010–11: 22,160 (League One) 
2009–10: 20,982 (League One) 
2008–09: 17,849 (Championship) 
2007–08: 22,253 (Championship) 
2006–07: 23,556 (Championship) 
2005–06: 23,614 (Championship) 
2004–05: 30,610 (Premier League) 
2003–04: 31,699 (Premier League) 
2002–03: 30,680 (Premier League) 
2001–02: 30,633 (Premier League)
Seasons interrupted by the COVID-19 pandemic

Record attendance:
32,363 v Coventry City, Championship 28 April 2012

Biggest Saints wins at St Mary's
8–0 v Sunderland, Premier League 18 October 2014 
6–1 v Tranmere Rovers, League Cup 2 October 2002 
6–1 v Aston Villa, Premier League 16 May 2015 
5–0 v Huddersfield Town, League One 2 March 2010 
5–1 v Walsall, League One 27 February 2010 
4–0 v Tottenham Hotspur, FA Cup 4 January 2003 
4–0 v Hull City, Championship 8 February 2007 
4–0 v Dagenham & Redbridge, League One 2 November 2010 
4–0 v Exeter City, League One 1 January 2011 
4–0 v Watford, Championship 1 October 2011 
4–0 v Derby County, Championship 18 February 2012 
4–0 v Coventry City, Championship 28 April 2012 
4–0 v Newcastle United, Premier League 29 March 2014 
4–0 v Newcastle United, Premier League 13 September 2014 
4–0 v Arsenal, Premier League 26 December 2015

Biggest Saints defeats at St Mary's
0–9 v Leicester City, Premier League 25 October 2019 
0–6 v Chelsea, Premier League 9 April 2022 
1–6 v Liverpool, League Cup 2 December 2015 
0–5 v Arsenal, FA Cup 28 January 2017 
1–5 v Chelsea, FA Cup 5 January 2013 
0–4 v Manchester United, FA Cup 12 March 2005

Highest scoring games at St Mary's
Southampton 0–9 Leicester, Premier League 25 October 2019
Southampton 8–0 Sunderland, Premier League 18 October 2014 
England 5–3 Kosovo, UEFA Euro 2020 qualifying, 11 September 2019 
Southampton 6–1 Tranmere Rovers, League Cup 2 October 2002  
Southampton 4–3 Norwich City, Premier League 30 April 2005  
Southampton 3–4 Leeds United, Championship 19 November 2005  
Southampton 4–3 Milton Keynes Dons, FA Cup 7 January 2006 
Southampton 5–2 Yeovil Town, League Cup 23 August 2006 
Southampton 4–3 Birmingham City, Championship 29 November 2006 
Southampton 5–2 Barnsley, Championship 17 February 2007 
Southampton 4–3 Burnley, FA Cup 4 January 2014 
Southampton 6–1 Aston Villa, Premier League 16 May 2015  
Southampton 1–6 Liverpool, League Cup 2 December 2015 
Southampton 2–5 Tottenham Hotspur, Premier League 20 September 2020

Top scorers (as of 18 March 2022)

References

External links

 Review St Mary's at the Football Ground Guide
 Saints Forever's guide to St Mary's
 Saints Forever's Pub Guide
 The Official Website  of Southampton FC.
 Up The Saints' guide to St Mary's
 Satellite image of St Mary's Stadium from Google Maps

Southampton F.C.
Football venues in England
Premier League venues
Sports venues in Hampshire
Buildings and structures in Southampton
Sports venues completed in 2001
English Football League venues
Tourist attractions in Southampton
Sport in Southampton
2001 establishments in England
UEFA Women's Euro 2022 stadiums